The 15th African Championships in Athletics were held in Mauritius between August 9 and August 13, 2006. The event was staged at Stade Germain Comarmond in Bambous, Rivière Noire District. This was the second time when the African Championships in Athletics were hosted in Mauritius, the first was in 1992.

Many world-class runners were competing, but in terms of the field events the standard was poor. In addition, some of those, especially the throwing events, had very few participants as African federations cannot afford to send large teams.

Men's results

Track

 Many sources (including the IAAF) list the lead off runner as Grace Ebor, a female Nigerian middle-distance runner. This is incorrect as the lead off runner was actually Peter Emelieze.

Field

Women's results

Track

Field

Medals table

Participating nations

 (20)
 (8)
 (13)
 (7)
 (4)
 (11)
 (1)
 (3)
 (1)
 (1)
 (7)
 (3)
 (14)
 (4)
 (23)
 (2)
 (20)
 (36)
 (2)
 (10)
 (6)
 (1)
 (8)
 (33)
 (25)
 (6)
 (6)
 (32)
 (4)
 (5)
 (20)
 (14)
 (1)
 (2)
 (53)
 (2)
 (4)
 (2)
 (12)
 (4)
 (4)
 (4)

See also
2006 in athletics (track and field)

References

Day reports
Ouma, Mark (2006-08-07). Mauritius expects star studded African Championships - Preview. IAAF. Retrieved on 2011-09-17.
Ouma, Mark (2006-08-10). Bekele and Gaisah victorious - two titles for Egypt - African Champs Day One. IAAF. Retrieved on 2011-09-17.
Ouma, Mark (2006-08-11). Defar defeats Dibaba; Van Zyl surges to victory – African Champs Day Two. IAAF. Retrieved on 2011-09-17.
Ouma, Mark (2006-08-12). Kenyan wins by Kipsiele Koech, Kiptum, Kipchirchir - African Champs Day Three. IAAF. Retrieved on 2011-09-17.
Ouma, Mark (2006-08-13). South Africans steal the show - African Championships report - Day Four. IAAF. Retrieved on 2011-09-17.
Ouma, Mark (2006-08-14). Anim and Kipchirchir complete doubles in Mauritius - African Champs Final Day. IAAF. Retrieved on 2011-09-17.

External links 
 Full results 
 Confederation of African Athletics
 Association Mauricienne d'Athlétisme amateur 
 Official results report

 
African Championships in Athletics
African Championships in Athletics
African Championships in Athletics
African Championships in Athletics
African Championships in Athletics, 2006
Bambous, Mauritius
Athletics in Mauritania
African Championships in Athletics